Allocation money, in Major League Soccer, represents an amount of money that teams may use to sign players and/or allocate to their salaries to get under the salary cap.

Reasons for obtaining
MLS teams receive general allocation money for these reasons:
 End-of-season allocation of $200,000 for each team that does not make the post season (CBA section 10.17 & roster rules)
 Expansion year allocation of $1.1 million for each expansion team (CBA section 10.18a)
 Expansion year allocation of $100,000 for each existing team (CBA section 10.18b)
 Annual allocation of $200,000 for each team (CBA section 10.19a)
 Qualification for the CONCACAF Champions League allocation of $140,000 for each qualified team (roster rules)
 Transfer or loan of player to another club outside of MLS allocation of up to $750,000 for each transfer or loan (CBA section 10.19e & roster rules)
 Third Designated Player charge distribution (CBA section 10.19f)
 Free agency compensation of $50,000 per net player loss (CBA section 29.7b)
 Expansion Draft compensation of $50,000 for each player selected

MLS teams receive targeted allocation money for these reasons:
 Annual allocation of $100,000 for each team (CBA section 10.19b)
 December 2016 announcement of $1.2 million of additional targeted allocation money for each team
 Teams may also pull forward and use immediately the $100,000 of targeted allocation money and $1.2 million of additional targeted allocation money designated for 2019
 December 2017 announcement of up to $2.8 million of team-funded targeted allocation money for each team

All numbers are for 2018 season.

Uses
General allocation money can be used in several ways:
 Reduce the amount that a non-Designated Player costs against the salary cap down to the league minimum salary ($67,500 in 2018).
 Reduce the amount that a Designated Player costs against the salary cap down to $150,000.
 Sign players new to MLS.
 Re-sign an existing MLS player.
 Off-set acquisition cost (loan and transfer fees).
 In connection with the extension of a player's contract for the second year provided the player was new to MLS in the immediately prior year.
 Trade it to another team.

General allocation money must be used within 30 days of the close of the third full MLS transfer window after it was acquired. If a quantity of general allocation money is not used within that timeframe, it is halved by the league. That halved amount is then available for use during the next two transfer windows. If it is still not used after those transfer windows, the quantity is no longer available for use.

Targeted allocation money can be used in several ways:
 Sign new or re-sign existing players whose salary and acquisition costs are more than the maximum salary budget charge ($504,375 in 2018) up to $1.5 million.
 Convert a Designated Player to a non-Designated Player by buying down his salary budget charge to below the maximum salary budget charge provided the club then signs a new Designated Player at an investment equal to or greater than the player he is replacing.
 Sign new homegrown players to their first MLS contract using up to $200,000 of targeted allocation money.
 Trade league-funded targeted allocation money to another team.

Targeted allocation money must be applied, if not necessarily used, within four MLS transfer windows of its acquisition. In this case, "applied" does not mean a team actually has to use the amount within four windows. Rather, they merely have to notify the league of how they plan on using their expiring targeted allocation money – allocating a specific amount to a specific player – in the following window by the end of the fourth window after it was acquired. If they do not do that, that amount expires.

Targeted allocation money and general allocation money may not be used in combination when signing or re-signing a player. Either targeted allocation money or general allocation money may be used on a player in a single season, not both.

Amounts of allocation money held by each team are not disclosed to the general public. Only in the case of a trade will the amount of allocation money involved be made public.

Twice in league history, an allocation received for a lost player was used on the same player upon his return to the league: by the Chicago Fire on Ante Razov and by the New England Revolution on Daniel Hernandez.

Other allocations
Allocation money is not to be confused with the MLS Allocation Order, which is a ranking used to determine which MLS club has first priority to acquire a player who is in MLS allocation list. MLS allocation list contains select U.S. National Team players and players transferred outside of MLS garnering transfer fee of at least $500,000. Along with Allocation Money, Allocation Order rankings can be traded, provided that part of the compensation received in return is another club's Allocation ranking.

See also
1996 MLS Inaugural Allocations
Designated Player Rule

References

Major League Soccer rules and regulations